1969 is an album by Hungarian guitarist Gábor Szabó featuring performances recorded in 1969 and released on the Skye label.
This album is peaked #143 on Billboard 200 on 1969/08/16.

Reception
The Allmusic review states: "The Hungarian guitarist doesn't always stretch out as much as he could on this album; at times, he ends a solo that probably should have lasted a few more minutes. But Szabo still deserves credit for bringing a jazz perspective to songs that so many other improvisers were ignoring".

Track listing
 "Dear Prudence" (John Lennon, Paul McCartney) - 2:37 
 "Sealed With a Kiss" (Peter Udell, Gary Geld) - 2:41 
 "Both Sides Now" (Joni Mitchell) - 2:54 
 "Walk Away Renee" (Michael Brown, Bob Calilli, Tony Sansone) - 2:42 
 "You Won't See Me" (Lennon, McCartney) - 3:31 
 "Michael from Mountains" (Joni Mitchell) - 3:56 
 "Stormy" (Buddy Buie, James Cobb) - 3:12 
 "In My Life" (Lennon, McCartney) - 2:25 
 "I've Just Seen a Face" (Lennon, McCartney) - 4:30 
 "Until It's Time for You to Go" (Buffy Sainte-Marie) - 2:18 
 "Somewhere I Belong" (Gábor Szabó) - 3:33 
Recorded at United Recording Studio in Los Angeles, California on January 20–24, 1969

Personnel
Gábor Szabó - guitar
Francois Vaz - guitar
Mike Melvoin - organ
Louis Kabok - bass
Randy Cierley-Sterling - electric bass
Jim Keltner - drums, percussion
George Ricci - cello
Gary McFarland - arranger

References

Skye Records albums
Gábor Szabó albums
1969 albums
Albums produced by Gary McFarland
Instrumental albums
Albums arranged by Gary McFarland